The Reds Bagnell Award is presented annually to an individual for their contributions to the game of American football.  The award is presented by the Maxwell Football Club. It is named for longtime Club president and College Football Hall of Fame member Reds Bagnell.

Winners

References

American football trophies and awards